Berekeh or Barakeh or Barkeh or Berkeh may refer to:

Berkeh, Fars
Berkeh-ye Mah Banu, Fars Province
Berkeh-ye Mollai, Fars Province
Berkeh-ye Sefid, Fars Province
Barakeh, Kurdistan
Berekeh, Lorestan
Barkeh-ye Chupan, Bushehr Province
Berkeh-ye Khalaf, Hormozgan Province
Berkeh-ye Now, Hormozgan Province
Berkeh-ye Soltan, Hormozgan Province
Barkeh Lari, Hormozgan Province
Berkeh-ye Soflin, Hormozgan Province